Karl Hugo Prüter, commonly referred to as Karl Pruter (July 3, 1920 – November 18, 2007), was an Old Catholic bishop in the United States. He founded the Christ Catholic Church.

Pruter was raised in a Lutheran church and served as a Congregationalist minister under the name of Hugo Rehling Pruter, Sr., from 1945 to 1958. In the Congregationalist Church, he was one of the leaders of the liturgical movement in the church during the late 1940s and early 1950s. He was also an opponent of the merger of the Congregational Christian Churches with the Evangelical and Reformed Church to form the United Church of Christ, begun in 1957 and concluded in 1961. As a continuing Congregationalist, he led his church and several other Midwest Congregational churches to reject the merger and form a new body, the Central Association of Congregational Christian Churches.

In the late 1960s, Pruter became involved in the Free Catholic Movement, an association that lasted until his death. Pruter's introduction to the Free Catholic Movement and Old Catholicism came in 1963, when he traveled to Europe, where he met several leaders of the Old Catholic tradition. When he returned to the United States, he settled in Boston hoping to find an available church or bishop. Not finding any, he arranged with Archbishop Peter A. Zurawetsky to start a new church in the Back Bay area of Boston, which stressed the contemplative life, mysticism, and a faith based on personal experience.

Pruter was consecrated as bishop of the Diocese of Boston by archbishops Peter A. Zurawetsky and Uladyslau Ryzy-Ryski in 1967. The following year, Pruter designated his diocese an independent communion. After a meeting the following year, the new Christ Catholic Church was recognized when its constitution and canons were given to it by Archbishop Zurawetsky.

Pruter was a vigorous publisher and distributor of literature in his fields of interest. The press he founded, St. Willibrord Press, was a major distributor of literature about Old Catholicism. He wrote a number of tracts and pamphlets, as well as books such as The Teachings of the Great Mystics and A History of the Old Catholic Church. He also operated the Tsali Bookstore, specializing in Native American literature, and Cathedral Books which emphasizes literature about the topic of peace.

In his later years Pruter made his home in Highlandville, Missouri. He gained notice for Christ Catholic Church when he converted a small wash-house near the east site of his home there into a chapel. Since the official chapel of a bishop is technically designated as a "cathedral" the structure was featured for decades in the Guinness Book of World Records as "The World's Smallest Cathedral". The structure in later years featured a small blue copola, small stained glass window, and three rows of pews about five feet across.
 
Pruter died on 18 November 2007.

Books by Pruter 

Pruter, Karl. (1987) Jewish Christians in the United States: A bibliography  New York: Garland Pub.. Book )
Pruter, Karl. (1985) The theology of Congregationalism  San Bernardino, Calif.: Borgo Press.
Pruter, Karl. (1985) The teachings of the great mystics  San Bernardino, Calif.: Borgo Press.
Pruter, Karl. (1985) Neo-congregationalism  San Bernardino, Calif.: Borgo Press.
Pruter, Karl. (1985) A history of the Old Catholic Church  San Bernardino, Calif.: Borgo Press.
Pruter, Karl. (1985) The people of God  San Bernardino, Calif.: Borgo Press.
 Pruter, Karl. (1986) Bishops extraordinary  San Bernardino, Calif.: Borgo Press. Book )
 Pruter, Karl. (1986) The strange partnership of George Alexander McGuire and Marcus Garvey  San Bernardino, Calif.: Borgo Press. 
Pruter, Karl. (1995) A directory of autocephalous bishops of the Churches of the Apostolic succession 7th, rev. and expanded. edition.  San Bernardino, Calif.: St. Willibrord's Press. 
Pruter, Karl. (1996) The priest's handbook 2nd, rev. and expanded edition.  San Bernardino, Calif.: St. Willibrord's Press. Book, Vol. 4 in a series/set )
Pruter, Karl. (1996) The directory of autocephalous bishops of the churches of the Apostolic succession 8th, rev. and expanded. edition.  San Bernardino, Calif.: St. Willibrord's Press. Book, Vol. 1 in a series/set )
Pruter, Karl. (1996) The Old Catholic Church: A history and chronology 2nd, rev. and expanded. edition.  San Bernardino, Calif.: St. Willibrord's Press.
Pruter, Karl. (1997) The mystic path  San Bernardino, Calif.: St. Willibrord's Press. Book, Vol. 5 in a series/set )
Pruter, Karl; Melton, J. Gordon. (1983) The Old Catholic sourcebook  New York: Garland Pub.

References

External links
 Cathedral of the Prince of Peace, Christ Catholic Church official website

1920 births
2008 deaths
American Old Catholic bishops
Former Lutherans
Former Congregationalists
20th-century American clergy